The State Pension is part of the United Kingdom Government's pension arrangements.  Benefits vary depending on the age of the individual and their contribution record. Anyone can make a claim, provided they have a minimum number of qualifying years of contributions.

Background

Basic State Pension 
The basic State Pension (alongside the Graduated Retirement Benefit, the State Earnings-Related Pension Scheme, and the State Second Pension) is payable to men born before 6 April 1951, and to women born before 6 April 1953. The maximum amount payable is £141.85 a week (April 2022 - April 2023).

New State Pension 
The new State Pension is payable to men born on or after 6 April 1951, and to women born on or after 6 April 1953. The maximum amount payable is £185.15 a week (April 2022 - April 2023).

Contribution record 

The State Pension is a 'contribution-based' benefit, and depends on an individual's National Insurance (NI) contribution history. To qualify for a full pension (amounts given above), an individual would require:
 basic State Pension: 30 qualifying years (years in which NI contributions were paid) for contributors claiming between 6 April 2010 and 5 April 2016;
 new State Pension: 35 qualifying years (years in which NI contributions were paid) for customers claiming from 6 April 2016.
In years where fewer than 52 weeks' NI were paid, the year is disregarded. With fewer qualifying years smaller, pro-rata, pension is paid. People who were contracted-out paid lower NI contributions will receive a lower state pension.

Pension uprating 

The basic State Pension is increased in April each year to pensioners living in the UK and in certain overseas countries which have a social security agreement with the UK that includes British pension uprating, in line with the CPI. All state pensions for these pensions are protected by the "triple lock" guarantee introduced by the 2010–2015 coalition government, meaning that the pension rises each year by either the annual price inflation, or average earnings growth, or a guaranteed 2.5% minimum, whichever is the greatest. Coming into effect each April, the uprating is based on the previous September's CPI inflation, along with the three-month average of weekly earnings starting in July of that year. The Triple Lock has been replaced for one year for the 2022 increase with a Double Lock with the average earnings element removed. This was because the government believed there was a statistical anomaly due to Covid having depressed the 2020 earnings figures.

Pensioners living in other countries without a current agreement (which includes most Commonwealth countries) have their pensions frozen at the rate in effect on the date when they left the UK, or on the date when they applied for a pension, whichever is later.

State Pension age
Before the Pensions Act 1995, the state pension age had been 60 for women, and 65 for men. The Act changed this so that the women's pension age would be made equal with men, but that the transition should only be phased in from 2010 to 2020. In 2006, a cross party Parliamentary report again recommended equalisation of ages on the basis of equal treatment of both sexes. It also recommended a rise in the state pension age for both men and women to 68 between 2024 and 2046. The rationale for the age rise was that people would be living longer in the future. This was put into effect by the Pensions Act 2007.

However, when the Conservative and Liberal Democrat coalition took power, the Pensions Act 2011 accelerated the rise of the state pension age to 66 for both men and women by 6 October 2020. Under the Pensions Act 2014, the coalition government again accelerated the rise in the state pension age to 67 by 6 April 2028.

In May 2019, a challenge in the High Court failed to reverse decisions to accelerate the equalisation of the pension ages on the ground that not enough notice was given. The Conservative Party in its 2019 manifesto stated that it would not change the rules, while the Labour Party committed itself to compensating women who were unfairly affected by the changes in the pension age. An appeal to the Court of Appeal against the decision of the High Court was dismissed on 15 September 2020. On 31 March 2021 the Supreme Court refused the women's application for permission to appeal against the decision of the Court of Appeal.

The current ages for the state pension in law are as follows:

Women born between 1950 and 1953

Men and women born between 1953 and 1960

Men and women born between 1960 and 1978

Deferral
It is possible to defer claiming a State Pension at SPA.

For individuals who reached SPA before 6 April 2016, deferred pensions are increased by 1% for every 5 weeks that the pension is not claimed (approximately 10.4% per year). Alternatively pensioners who have deferred their pension can claim a lump sum and an unenhanced pension. The lump sum is the amount of pension payments foregone plus interest at 2% per year over the Bank of England base rate.

For individuals who reach SPA on or after 6 April 2016, deferred pensions are increased by 1% for every 9 weeks that the pension is not claimed (approximately 5.8% per year).

Calculations 
The basic State Pension is based on the National Insurance record of the individual. Each year that National Insurance was paid is called a qualifying year. For 2012–2013 to be a qualifying year you need to earn at least £5564 if you are an employee, or £5595 if you are self-employed, and have paid (or been credited with) National Insurance contributions based on these earnings.

Men born after 5 April 1945 and women born after 5 April 1950 need 30 qualifying years for a full Basic State Pension, with a single qualifying year required to get any State Pension. Men born before 6 April 1945 needed 44 qualifying years for a full basic State Pension, and women born before 6 April 1950 needed 39 years; to get any State Pension, an individual needed 25 per cent of the qualifying years required for a full pension.

Since April 6, 2016, 35 qualifying years are needed to receive the full new state pension. State Pension amounts can be reduced if the pensioner was in a contracted-out works pension scheme.

Individuals with less than a full record of qualifying years, may elect to pay voluntary National Insurance contributions, in order to boost their record for pension purposes.

People in certain circumstances, such as caring for a severely disabled person for more than 20 hours a week or claiming unemployment or sickness benefits, can claim National Insurance credits.

The amount of the basic State Pension received is calculated by multiplying the full rate by the number of qualifying years and dividing by the number of years needed for the full rate.

NI contributions paid between April 1961 and April 1975 result in an entitlement to a small Graduated Retirement pension.

NI contributions paid between April 1978 and April 2002 result in an entitlement to an additional pension from the State Earnings Related Pension Scheme, although this will be very small if the individual was "contracted out" of this arrangement. Since April 2002 NI contributions have earned an additional State Second Pension.

Married couples 
A wife or husband can claim extra basic State Pension based on the National Insurance contributions paid by his or her husband or wife (this extra is called a Category B pension).

If a woman has a Category A basic State Pension of less than 60 per cent of the full basic State Pension, then when she reaches her State Pension Age, she will have her basic State Pension topped-up to 60 per cent of her husband's Category A basic State Pension, once her husband reaches pension age.

Men, born after 5 April 1945, are able to claim a Category B pension based on their wives' contribution record. Similarly, civil partners who reach State Pension Age on or after 6 April 2010 are able to claim a Category B pension on the same basis.

Pension top-ups 

Married women with young children and carers can claim credits of National Insurance contributions.

Pensioners with low incomes can claim Pension Credit.

An 'age addition' of 25p a week is paid to people over 80.

Pensions Act 2007
A new approach was introduced following the findings of the all-party Pension Commission in 2006 and the white paper Security in retirement: towards a new pension system published in May 2006. The key provisions were:
Reduction of the qualifying years for a full basic State Pension from 44 years for men and 39 years for women to 30 years for both.
The basic State Pension's yearly increase is determined by a rule known as the “triple lock”, it being the greatest of:
the growth in national average earnings;
the growth in retail prices as measured by the Consumer Price Index;
2.5 per cent.
The contribution conditions for basic State Pension were changed so that it is easier for everyone to build up some entitlement.
Replacing Home Responsibility Protection (HRP) with a new system of weekly credits for parents and carers.
Raising the State Pension age for both women and men from 65 to 68 in three stages between 2024 and 2046.
Introducing National Insurance credits for parents and carers so that they can build up some entitlement to the Additional State Pension.
End of the option to contract out of the Additional State Pension through money-purchase private pensions.

Some modifications to this were made in the Pensions Act 2008.

Future flat-rate state pensions 
The government originally proposed that in April 2017 the basic State Pension and Second State Pension should both be replaced by a single, flat-rate pension. A green paper was issued in April 2011, followed by a White Paper in January 2013. The amount of an individual's flat-rate pension would depend on the number of qualifying years, with 35 qualifying years being needed for the maximum pension and pro-rata amounts for fewer qualifying years, subject to a minimum of about eight years. Rights already earned to a Second State Pension would not be lost. In the 2013 budget it was announced that introduction of the single tier pension will be brought forward by one year to 6 April 2016.

The new "single-tier" State Pension would be worth £144 a week (in 2012-13 terms). Provided they have 35 qualifying years, individuals would actually receive £144 a week, plus a "protected amount" if they have already earned a second State pension greater than £37 a week (which is the difference between the current basic State Pension and the proposed flat-rate pension), and minus a "rebate-derived amount" if they have paid smaller National Insurance contributions because they were "contracted out" of the Second State Pension Scheme (or its predecessor, the State Earnings Related Pension Scheme).

The new, single-tier State Pension would eventually remove the need for Pension Credit. It is also proposed that various rules regarding marriage, divorce and bereavement would be phased out. This would mean that Category B pensions (see above) would be replaced by Category A pensions for everyone, although any rights to a Category B pension that existed at the implementation date would be preserved.

These changes are now law, they were enacted by the Pensions Act 2014 which received royal assent on 14 May 2014.

See also 

 Pension Credit
 State Earnings-Related Pension Scheme
 State Second Pension
 Pension provision in the United Kingdom
 Women Against State Pension Inequality

Notes

External links
Guardian Special Report - State Pensions
Claiming - State Pensions

Pensions in the United Kingdom
Social security in the United Kingdom